The 1996 NHK Trophy was the fifth event of six in the 1996–97 ISU Champions Series, a senior-level international invitational competition series. It was held in Osaka on December 5–8. Medals were awarded in the disciplines of men's singles, ladies' singles, pair skating, and ice dancing. Skaters earned points toward qualifying for the 1996–97 Champions Series Final.

Competition notes
 Midori Ito was expected to compete, but withdrew before the competition when she retired from competitive figure skating and just skated in the Exhibition.

Results

Men

Ladies

Pairs

Ice dancing

References

External links
 1996 NHK Trophy

Nhk Trophy, 1996
NHK Trophy